Twort is an English surname. Notable people with the surname include:

Frederick Twort (1877–1950), English bacteriologist
Flora Twort (1893–1985), English artist and bookshop proprietor

English-language surnames